Jagged Alliance 2 is a tactical role-playing game for PC, released in 1999 for Microsoft Windows and later ported to Linux by Tribsoft. It is the third entry in the Jagged Alliance series. The game was followed by the expansion Unfinished Business in 2000. Two commercial versions of the mod Wildfire were released in 2004 in the form of expansion packs. The core game and the Unfinished Business expansion were combined and released under the title Jagged Alliance 2 Gold Pack in 2002.

The game takes place in the fictional country of Arulco, which has been ruled by the ruthless monarch Deidranna for several years. The player is put in control of hired mercenaries and with aid of local citizens and militia must reclaim Arulco's cities and ultimately defeat Deidranna.

The game uses a strategic map screen of Arulco where the player may issue high level strategic orders for their troops, such as travelling or prolonged training. Combat and individual location exploration takes place in tactical screen, where the player can issue individual direct commands to their mercenaries, such as run, shoot, talk and so on. The game features a wide variety of guns, armour and items that the player may use.

The game was commercially successful; Pelit estimated its sales at 300,000 units by 2006. However, it sold poorly in the United States. The game received positive scores from reviewers and was praised for its freedom of action, memorable characters and non-linear and tactical gameplay.

Gameplay

The game puts the player in control of several mercenaries that must explore and reclaim towns and territories from enemy forces. As the game advances, the player can hire new mercenaries and acquire better weapons and armour to combat opponents.

The map screen displays the world map of Arulco in a square grid (called sectors) and the forces deployed by the enemy and the player. This is the strategic side of the game, as the player directs his forces, and controls the progress of time, which may be sped up or paused. From here, the player can access the game's laptop function, allowing the player to receive emails from characters, buy weapons and equipment, and hire and fire mercenaries. This screen is used to give mercenaries tasks. Mercs with a medical kit and medical skill can be set to tend to wounded mercs; this significantly quickens their recovery. Mercs with a tool box and mechanical skill can be set to repair damaged weapons, tools and armour. Mercs can practice a skill by themselves or work as a trainer or student. Training a student increases their chosen skill. A trainer may train local citizens to become militia to defend sectors while the mercs are away. Mercs can be ordered to travel on foot between the sectors. If the player acquires a ground or aerial vehicle in-game, they may load their troops into it to travel between sectors much faster.

There is a tactical screen, where the player takes control of individual mercenaries during real-time interactions and turn-based combat. The tactical screen shows a sector from an isometric viewpoint. Here the player can view the terrain, explore buildings and find items. Although the game does not feature a visual fog of war, the non-player characters (NPCs) can only be seen if a player-controlled or allied character sees them. The game time advances in real-time on the tactical screen unless a battle is initiated, then the game switches to a turn-based combat mode. The player can control an individual merc or group of mercs, issuing move, communication and various interaction commands. Mercs can run, walk, swim, crouch or crawl. Mercs may climb onto the roofs of flat-roofed buildings.

Battles occur whenever the player's and enemy forces occupy the same sector. The game proceeds in real-time until a member of one force spots an enemy. The game then switches to turn-based play. Each force takes alternating turns to move, attack, and perform various other actions. Each character has a limited number of action points, which are spent to perform actions. The action points are renewed at the beginning of each round, depending on the physical state of the merc. Some unspent action points will be carried over to the next round. If a combatant has some action points left over during the enemy's turn and spots an enemy, they stand a chance of interrupting the enemy turn and performing actions.

Mercs can attack enemies in many different ways. Firearms such as handguns, machine guns, rifles, close combat and thrown weapons like knives and hand grenades, heavy weapons such as mortars, rocket-propelled grenades and light anti-tank weapons and explosives like mines, and bombs. When a merc attacks, they have a certain chance to hit the target depending on the appropriate skill, obstacles in the line of fire and the number of action points spent aiming. Walls, doors, and many objects can be destroyed using explosives or heavy weapons. Some battles may be automatically resolved if the player chooses to do so.

The game may be played using stealth elements. Mercs may move either in normal or stealth mode. In stealth mode, the merc attempts to move without making any noise. Moving stealthily costs more action points, but may successfully hide their position from enemies. The game features weapons that do not cause loud noise and camouflage kits, which when used may disguise the merc in their environment. Merc attributes and some special skills affect how stealthy they are.

The game features a large array of various items. These include weapons, armour, tools and miscellaneous items. Items can be traded between mercs, picked up, dropped or thrown. If a merc dies, they drop all their items. Enemies will sometimes drop items upon dying. Mercs can be hired with their own combat equipment. As the game progresses, the online shop offers a larger and better variety of weapons, armour and tools for sale. Mercenaries can equip and carry various items in their inventory. The mercs can wear armour on their head, chest and legs. Certain skills and interactions require a certain tool or object to be held in the hand. The mercs can hold one large weapon or dual wield two small weapons. Weapons may be improved via special attachments, for instance a silencer or bipod.

The player needs money to pay the mercenary hire fees and to purchase equipment. At the start of the game, the player is given a set amount of money. The main source of income in the game are silver and gold mines located in several towns. The player has to reclaim these town sectors and convince the local miners to work for the player to receive a daily income. Weaponry, equipment and miscellaneous items may be sold to local merchants.

Although the player is directed by rebels to head to Drassen first, the player may choose to capture the towns and explore the countryside in any order they desire. It is not required to capture any towns. Additionally, almost every sector may be entered via two or more entry points. The player may choose between a very large array of different mercs, allowing combinations for specific purposes – e.g. stealth combat, night combat, close-quarters combat and so on. The game features random treasure chests, characters and certain events that differ from game to game.

Characters
The characters in Jagged Alliance 2 are mercenaries, enemies, allies and the townsfolk; many of the NPC characters may be interacted with.

The game is played almost entirely through the mercenaries chosen. Mercenaries can be hired from private military company websites, or recruited from the local citizenry. The player may create one personalized, unique mercenary.

Characters are defined by their skills expressed in character points. Every character has an experience level, five attributes (agility, dexterity, strength, leadership, wisdom) and four skills (marksmanship, explosives, mechanical, medical). A character's level is increased by actively participating in the game. Skills are increased by performing actions based on these skills or by training. Attribute points may be lost if a character is critically wounded. Apart from this, a mercenary can have two (or one highly developed) special skills enhancing a certain aspect of his or her performance such as night operations, or lockpicking.

Each character has a certain number of health points, which are reduced when they take damage. Wounds can be bandaged by using first aid kits. This prevents the character from bleeding and losing more health but does not restore health points. A wounded mercenary is given less action points proportionally to their wounds. Health can be restored by resting, being treated by another mercenary with 'doctor'-'patient' pair of commands or visiting a hospital. When a mercenary runs very low on health, the character falls to the ground slowly dying, unable to do anything until medically treated. If a character dies, they cannot be resurrected.

Characters have an energy level, restored by sleep, rest, fluids or injections. Moving, using stealth and getting hit saps energy. Tired mercs who have not rested for a long time become exhausted faster. Exhausted characters will fall to the ground until they regain some energy.

Mercenaries have a morale level, mainly increased by victories and successful kills and decreased by the opposite. Happy mercs perform better, while unhappy mercs will complain and may leave the player's forces altogether.

Mercs who like each other and work together will have a higher morale than others. Mercenaries who dislike each other will complain often and eventually one of the two mercenaries will quit. Mercenaries may refuse to be hired if the player has already hired someone they dislike.

Plot
Jagged Alliance 2 takes place in the fictional nation of Arulco, ruled until the late 1980s by a unique democratic monarchy – monarchs led the nation, but elections were held every ten years to assert their legitimacy. In 1988, election candidate Enrico Chivaldori took a wife, Deidranna Reitman of Romania, in order to boost his popularity and consequently was victorious. However, Deidranna proved to be more than a pawn; showing a thirst for power, she framed Chivaldori for the murder of his father. Enrico managed to escape, faking his death. Removing all other obstacles from her way, she consolidated her power and converted Arulco into an authoritarian state.

When the game begins, Chivaldori has hired the player to remove Deidranna by whatever means necessary. He puts the player and their team of mercenaries in contact with a rebel movement in the northern town of Omerta. Omerta suffered a massive raid shortly before the events of the game, leaving the town damaged and nearly deserted. The rebel leader Miguel Cordona, former election candidate and opponent of Enrico, guides the player to the city of Drassen.

The game features a science fiction mode that introduces enemies not present in realistic mode – the "Crepitus", a species of giant insect living underground, infesting mines and occasionally emerging to the surface.

Development 

In an interview with Game.EXE during the game's development, SirTech noted an intention to preserve freedom of movement, character relationships and flexible storyline from the previous title. Among the new features discussed were a real-time mode and player own character's generation. In a later interview during game's alpha release, the game's designer Ian Currie noted the addition of role-playing and strategy elements compared to the previous title. He explained that — while the tactical game mode was well suited for multiplayer — it would not be implementing, explaining that non-linear story and role-playing elements did not suit multiplayer. The developers explained the game being delayed due to heavy improvements in the game engine, graphics and the creation of a detailed world, and originally expected to release in October 1998. Currie explains the game engine had several ground-up rewrites and that significant time was spent on the game's physics and projectile ballistics, as well as the creation of the non-linear storyline.

A demo of the game, containing a unique map named Demotown, was released in the summer of 1998 through distribution with various gaming magazines.

An open source AmigaOS 4 port was released on June 28, 2008.

Reception

Sales
Jagged Alliance 2 became a commercial success and, according to designer Ian Currie, was the second-largest hit published by TalonSoft. By October 1999, Udo Hoffman of PC Player reported that its sales had surpassed 100,000 units in Germany and that distributor TopWare was pleased with the returns. It debuted at #1 in April 1999 on Germany's computer game sales charts and held the position the following month, before falling to ninth in June. It claimed 14th for July. However, the game flopped in North America: PC Data reported sales of 24,000 for Jagged Alliance II through the end of 1999. The editors of GameSpot nominated it for their 1999 "Best Game No One Played" award, which ultimately went to Disciples: Sacred Lands. Regarding Jagged Alliance 2s global sales, Pelits Niko Nirvi reported that "estimates of sales bounced between 150,000–500,000." He remarked that team member Chris Camfield placed its sales at 300,000 units by 2006, a figure that Nirvi said "sounds credible".

Critical reviews

Jagged Alliance 2 received a score of 85.09% from review aggregation website GameRankings. GameSpot praised its non-linear gameplay, freedom of action and variety of tactics and mercenary character traits, while IGN highlighted its story-telling and role-playing, detailed world, challenging opponents and excellent audio. Computer Gaming World presented the game Editor's Choice award, and Jeff Green described it as a hardcore game, praising its selection of mercenaries, replay value and combat planning, although noted AI was not very intelligent and graphics weren't strong.

Jagged Alliance 2 was a finalist for Computer Games Strategy Plus, GameSpot's and Computer Gaming Worlds 1999 "Strategy Game of the Year" awards, which it lost to RollerCoaster Tycoon, Age of Empires II: The Age of Kings and Homeworld, respectively. It was also nominated in GameSpot's "Best Sound" and "Best Game No One Played" categories. The editors of Computer Games wrote, "Sirtech's amazing hybrid of detailed tactical strategy and role-playing delivered the goods. How many real-time games have this much tension?"

Legacy
After the release of the original Jagged Alliance 2, two sequels and various mods have been released, including a prequel titled Jagged Alliance: Flashback which was released on Steam in October 2014.

Unfinished Business
Jagged Alliance 2: Unfinished Business, alternatively known as Jagged Alliance 2.5 is a short, mission-based standalone sequel released by Sir-Tech on December 5, 2000. This release adds some tweaks to the combat engine, as well as a scenario editor, The gameplay remains largely unchanged.

A new plot is introduced in Unfinished Business. The original owners of Arulco's lucrative mines have returned and established a missile base on the nearby island of Tracona, demanding the mines are returned to them. They destroy the Arulco's now empty Tixa prison to show an example for if their demands are not met. The player must put a team of mercenaries together to infiltrate Tracona and disable the missile base. Alternatively, the player may choose to use the characters from a previously saved Jagged Alliance 2: Gold savegame. Unfinished Business is notably harder than the original.

The product appears to be rushed as the gameplay is virtually the same as the original's, the play-time of Unfinished Business is much shorter, and the plot is linear and thus lacks replayability value. Sir-tech was experiencing financial problems at the time, most significantly trouble finding a publisher.

Gold Pack
Jagged Alliance 2: Gold Pack was published by Strategy First on August 6, 2002 and adds the improvements of Unfinished Business to the final release of Jagged Alliance 2. The Unfinished Business and a scenario editor are included in the package.

Gold Pack introduces notable changes to the difficulty setting. The player choosing an advanced difficulty level may decide to make the player turns timed and whether to disallow saving during combat, as opposed to the original Jagged Alliance 2, which set these settings automatically.

As of July 2006 it is available via the Steam content delivery system, as well as Turner Broadcasting's GameTap.

Wildfire
Jagged Alliance 2: Wildfire was published by i-Deal Games in 2004 as an official expansion pack by Strategy First. The game's source code was published in the package, under a license permitting non-commercial use.

Comparing to the original Jagged Alliance 2, Wildfire has not altered the game engine or controls. The focus was instead directed into designing revamped environments, new items and stronger enemies. This presents players with a more challenging campaign, however the goals and progression remain the same. In terms of the gameplay features, the game remains almost unchanged.

A renewed commercial release of Wildfire, dubbed version 6, through European publisher Zuxxez Entertainment in 2005 saw the Jagged Alliance series staying on shop shelves more than five years after the debut of its second iteration. Wild Fire version 6 contains changed sourcecode, a tweaked graphics engine that allows for a higher resolution, introduces new mercenaries and increases squad size from 6 to 10.

Back in Action

Jagged Alliance: Back in Action is a 3D remake of Jagged Alliance 2. It was developed by Coreplay and published by bitComposer and Kalypso Media in 2012. It was announced in 2010 as Jagged Alliance 2: Reloaded and renamed to Back in Action in 2011.

Modding and community development
Jagged Alliance 2: Gold has seen numerous community mods after its release and especially after the source code release. Notable examples include v1.13, Urban Chaos and Deidranna Lives.

JA2-Stracciatella

The JA2-Stracciatella project aims for cross platform capabilities for Jagged Alliance 2 by porting the vanilla Wildfire source code to SDL as underlying library. Mac OS, Linux, Android and other source ports were released as result. Also, Stracciatella can be seen as an unofficial patch project, since the second focus is the fixing of technical errors (like buffer overflows) and the removal of technical limitations without changing the game's balancing. The last commit of project initiator Tron in the project repository was r7072 from August 2010. In March 2013 the JA2-Stracciatella project was continued by another developer and transferred to a new repository. Support for higher resolutions and additional fixes were introduced. In March 2016 the project was continued on GitHub.

v1.13
v1.13 is an enhanced version of Jagged Alliance 2 Gold and partial conversion mod of the game. The main change from the original code is the "externalisation" of many previously hardcoded variables to editable XML files, allowing users a great level of modding flexibility. It introduced many new features and items, as well as a multiplayer mode. Since July, 2007, 1.13 has been successfully ported to Linux.  It is also backwards-compatible with a base Jagged Alliance 2 installation.

References

External links
Official website via Internet Archive
Jagged Alliance 2 at MobyGames

1999 video games
Amiga games
AmigaOS 4 games
Commercial video games with freely available source code
Jagged Alliance
Linux games
MacOS games
Proprietary software that uses SDL
Single-player video games
Sir-Tech games
Strategy First games
Tactical role-playing video games
Turn-based tactics video games
Video game sequels
Video games developed in Canada
Video games scored by Kevin Manthei
Video games set in a fictional country
Video games with expansion packs
Video games with isometric graphics
Windows games
TalonSoft games